Finnish-Chinese relations are the foreign relations between Finland and China.

History
Along with Sweden and Denmark, Finland was one of the first Western countries to recognize the People's Republic of China and form diplomatic relations with the country in 1950. The embassy in Beijing was opened in April 1952, and the first resident Finnish ambassador to China, Helge von Knorring, presented his letter of credence to Mao Zedong on 9 May 1952.

Later that same year, an economic department headed by Olavi J. Mattila was opened at the embassy to foster the development of trade relations. As a consequence, Finland became the first capitalist country to sign a bilateral trade agreement with the People's Republic of China in 1953.

These steps, as well as Finland's staunch support for PRC's membership in the UN, formed a solid basis to the nations' relations well into the 1980s. Since the early 1990s, there has been at least one official minister-level state visit from Finland to China each year.

Human rights

Hong Kong national security law
In June 2020, Finland openly opposed the Hong Kong national security law

Trade
Finland and China have had an agreement on economic, industrial, scientific and technological co-operation since 1973, and the agreement was last revised in 2005. The two principal trade organizations between the countries are Finland-China Trade Association and the China Council for Promotion of International Trade (CCPIT).

One of the fastest growing areas of trade between the two countries is in environmental protection and information technology.

Information technology

Linux, the open source code first developed by Finnish software engineer Linus Torvalds, is playing a major role in the development of China's IT sector – and in the country's rapid industrial development as a whole. Researcher, investor and open source code promoter Mikko Puhakka believes that Linux has established a good foundation for Finnish-Chinese cooperation.

The roots of the Chinese open source code are in Finland. Professor Gong Min started using and developing Linux when he was doing his PhD research at the Helsinki University of Technology in the early 1990s. Returning to China in 1996, Professor Gong Min took Linux with him on 20 floppy disks. This is seen as the birth of Chinese open source code development and Professor Gong Min is now among the 20 most influential people in China.

The first Linux server was started in May 1997 in Changzhou. Its domain name was cLinux.ml.org. Today a local distribution of Linux, the Red Flag Linux, is a compulsory subject in 1,000 Chinese universities by 2008. The Chinese view open source code as a critical factor in the country's development.

Nokia is the largest Finnish investor in China.

Sister cities

Shanghai-Espoo

The cities of Espoo and Shanghai are sister cities since 1998. Ever since, various collaboration programs have been carried out in areas of science and technology, urban development, culture, education, health care and environmental protection. The last high-level meeting was in June 2012 when the Mayor of Espoo, Mr Jukka Mäkelä, met the Mayor of Shanghai, Mr Han Zheng, during a visit to China.

In recent years, Finland-China relations have been strengthened by various Espoo-Shanghai actions.

Aalto University signed a Memorandum of Understanding with Tongji University and thereafter Aalto Design Factory Shanghai was established to Tongji University Campus during spring 2010.

China - Finland ICT Alliance was initiated in April 2009 with workshops in Beijing and Shanghai, opened by Mr. Matti Vanhanen, Former Prime Minister of Finland and Mr. Wan Gang, Minister of Science and Technology of China. The initiative is run by TIVIT Oy - Strategic Centre for Science, Technology and Innovation in ICT.

China Finland Golden Bridge Innovation Center, an Espoo-based transparent service platform supported by both countries' governments. In March 2010, the Golden Bridge Memorandum of understanding was signed by Chinese vice Minister of Commerce Mr GAO Hucheng and Finnish Minister of Economic Affairs Mr Mauri Pekkarinen.

Rovio, Espoo based Finnish video game developer and entertainment company, creator of Angry Birds, opened first oversea office in Baoshan district Shanghai in October 2011. In July 2012, Rovio opened Angry Birds brand store in Shanghai. 

Zhongguancun ZPark Software Park, China's largest science and technology park, settled in Espoo in year 2012.

Spying in Finland 
China and Russia are suspected of large-scale spying of the IT networks at the Finnish Ministry for Foreign Affairs. The spying focused on data traffic between Finland and the European Union, and is believed to have continued for four years. The spying was uncovered in spring 2013, and  the Finnish Security Intelligence Service (Supo) was investigating the breach.

See also 
 Foreign relations of China 
 Foreign relations of Finland
 China–European Union relations
 Chinese people in Finland

References

External links
Chinese Embassy in Finland
Finnish Embassies in China
Finland China Society

 
Finland
China, People's Republic of